Küster may refer to:

 Ernst Georg Ferdinand Küster (1839–1930), German surgeon
 Ernst Küster (1874–1953), German botanist
 Heinrich Carl Küster (1807–1876), malacologist and entomologist from Germany
 Ludolph Küster (1670–1716), editor of ancient Greek texts

See also
Kuster